Floyd Harold Ebaugh (May 30, 1914 – June 10, 1980) was an American professional basketball player. He played for the Akron Goodyear Wingfoots (AGW) in the National Basketball League for three seasons, from 1938–42, including in the playoffs for the 1941–42 season. 

Ebaugh averaged 4.2 points over the course of his 73-game career with AGW. Following his NBL career, Ebaugh played for the independent teams the Toledo White Huts, Lincoln Woodman Accidents, Akron Collegians, Dayton Collegians and Dayton Bombers.

Ebaugh was born and grew up in Superior, Nebraska. He attended Superior High School and graduated in 1932. Alongside playing basketball at high school, he was also on the track team, competing in the 880 yard relay, high jump, shot put and discus. 

From 1934–38 Ebaugh attended Nebraska University and played on the college's basketball team. He was basketball team captain in his senior year.

References

1914 births
1980 deaths
Akron Goodyear Wingfoots players
American men's basketball players
Basketball players from Nebraska
Centers (basketball)
Nebraska Cornhuskers men's basketball players
People from Superior, Nebraska